Elections to Colchester Borough Council took place in May 1983. They were held on the same day as other local elections across the United Kingdom.

Summary

Ward Results

Berechurch

Castle

Copford & Eight Ash Green

Great & Little Horkesley

Great Tey

Harbour

Lexden

Mile End

New Town

Prettygate

Pyefleet

Shrub End

St. Andrews

St. Annes

St. Johns

St. Marys

Stanway

Tiptree

West Mersea

Wivenhoe

 
 
 

 

 

No Independent candidate as previous (-20.4%).

References

1983 English local elections
1983
1980s in Essex